All of the 55 Councillor seats for Suffolk Coastal were up for election on Thursday 3 May 2003. This was held on the same day as other local council elections across England. The elections were held after boundary changes.

Overall election result

References

Suffolk Coastal District Council elections